Grado may refer to:

People 
 Cristina Grado (1939–2016), Italian film actress
 Jonathan Grado (born 1991), American entrepreneur and photographer
 Francesco De Grado (fl. 1694–1730), Italian engraver
 Gaetano Grado, Italian mafioso
 Grado (wrestler) (born 1988), in-ring name of Scottish professional wrestler Graeme Stevely

Places
 Grado (parish), Spain
 Grado, Asturias, a municipio in the Principality of Asturias, Spain
 Grado, Friuli-Venezia Giulia, a comune in the Province of Gorizia, Italy
 El Grado, a municipality in the province of Huesca, Aragon, Spain

Other
 Grado Labs, an American headphone and phonograph cartridge manufacturer
 Grado. Süße Nacht, a 2004 novel by Austrian playwright Gustav Ernst
 Synod of Grado, a Roman Catholic council held in 579